Charlotte Harrison (born 31 July 1989) is a New Zealand field hockey player. She has competed for the New Zealand women's national field hockey team (the Black Sticks Women), including for the team at the 2012 and 2016 Summer Olympics and at the 2006 and 2010 Commonwealth Games, and as a reserve for the team at the 2008 Summer Olympics.

Harrison was first selected for the Black Sticks Women in October 2005 on the back of her performance for Northland in the National Hockey League that year. At the time, she was 16 years old, making her the youngest ever player selected for the Black Sticks Women. She played her first match for the Black Sticks on 31 October 2005, against Australia in Pakuranga, Auckland, as part of the 2005 Oceania Cup and World Cup qualifier.

Born in Palmerston North to Steve and Zanna Harrison, Charlotte spent most of her early life living in Whangarei. She is of Māori descent, and affiliates to the Ngāpuhi iwi. She has two younger sisters: Samantha, who joined Charlotte playing for the Black Sticks Women in 2009, and Anita. Despite Charlotte being two years older and three centimetres (1 in) shorter than her sister Samantha, once the two competed together for the Black Sticks, their similarities in appearance became apparent and were often mistaken for each other by commentators and match officials. This was partially alleviated by Samantha dyeing her hair brown in mid-2010, but within a year reverted to her natural blonde colour.

Harrison attended Whangarei Girls' High School, before later studying beauty therapy at the Auckland University of Technology. , she resides on Auckland's North Shore where she is employed as a beautician.

At club level, Harrison is a member of the Southern Districts Hockey Club, based in Papatoetoe, Auckland. In the National Hockey League, she is a member of the Northland women's team.

References

External links
 

1989 births
Living people
Field hockey players from Whangārei
People educated at Whangarei Girls' High School
New Zealand female field hockey players
Olympic field hockey players of New Zealand
Field hockey players at the 2006 Commonwealth Games
Field hockey players at the 2010 Commonwealth Games
Field hockey players at the 2012 Summer Olympics
Commonwealth Games silver medallists for New Zealand
Field hockey players at the 2016 Summer Olympics
Ngāpuhi people
New Zealand Māori sportspeople
Commonwealth Games medallists in field hockey
20th-century New Zealand women
21st-century New Zealand women
Medallists at the 2010 Commonwealth Games